The Fiji-class cruisers were a class of eleven light cruisers of the Royal Navy that saw extensive service throughout the Second World War. Each ship of the class was named after a Crown colony or other constituent territory of the British Commonwealth and Empire.  The class was also known as the Colony class, or Crown Colony class. Developed as more compact versions of the preceding s, the last three were built to a slightly modified design and were sometimes also called the Ceylon class.

Design
They were built to the limitations that the 1936 Second London Naval Treaty imposed on cruisers, which lowered the limit for a light cruiser set in the 1922 Washington Naval Treaty from 10,000 tons to 8,000 tons displacement. Externally they appeared as smaller derivatives of the 1936 s.

The Fiji-class cruisers however, like the  that followed in the middle of the war, essentially fit the same armament on a 1,000-ton less displacement. The Fiji and Minotaur classes were very tight designs, built largely in war emergency conditions with little margin for any great updating postwar. The  beam imposing crippling limits.

The Fiji class were distinguishable from the Towns as they had a transom stern and straight funnels and masts; those of the Towns being raked. The 6-inch Mk XXIII gun turrets and ammunition spaces were laid out as per the Edinburgh group of the Town class, except the after turrets were a deck lower as in the Southampton and Gloucester groups. The long turret version of the triple 6-inch gun fitted to the Fiji class were 25 tons heavier than the 150-ton turret on the Group 1 & 2 Towns and further cramped the design. The supply of ammunition to the  guns was also improved, dispensing with the complicated conveyor system.

Due to the size of the Fiji class, a number of the ships had their 'X' turret removed to fit additional light anti-aircraft (AA) guns. Ships of the first group were equipped with the High Angle Control System (HACS) for secondary armament AA fire while the Ceylon group used the Fuze Keeping Clock for AA fire control. Both groups used the Admiralty Fire Control Table for surface fire control of the main armament and the Admiralty Fire Control Clock for surface fire control of the secondary armament. By the late 1940s most of the Fiji class had the updated Type 274 'lock and follow' surface fire control radar, which massively increased the chance of hits from the opening salvoes. In the 1950s (except during the Korean War and Suez crisis) no more than one of the MKXIII turrets was ever manned, with 'B' and 'Y' turrets mothballed due to the huge manning requirements of the turrets. This allowed for more liveable peacetime conditions by operating with a crew of 610–750 rather than the wartime crew 1,000–1,100.

Modifications
The addition of radar sets meant that the aircraft were now surplus to requirements, allowing the removal of the aircraft and catapult. Not only did this provide additional accommodation spaces for enlarged wartime crews, but there was no longer the need to carry large quantities of volatile aviation fuel; in 1940,  had her bow blown off when a torpedo detonated the 5,700 gallons of aviation fuel stored forwards and was out of action for a year. Fiji and Kenya never received the catapult, Nigeria had hers removed in 1941 and the other ships had theirs removed between 1942 and 1944.

The Ceylon group were completed without 'X' 6-inch turret, and between 1944 and 1945, those of Bermuda, Jamaica, Mauritius and Kenya were also removed. This allowed the carriage of additional light AA weapons, a quadruple QF 2 pdr pom-pom mounting Mark VII generally being carried in 'X' position. Bermuda, Jamaica and Mauritius had 2 additional quadruple pom-poms added (for a total of five) and between two and four single pom-poms in powered mountings Mark XV. In Kenya, all pom-poms were removed, and were replaced with five twin and eight single 40 mm Bofors guns. By the end of the war, Newfoundland had one and Uganda had two American pattern quadruple 40 mm Bofors mounts Mark III and Nigeria had four single mounts Mark III. Generally, 6 to 24 20 mm Oerlikon guns were also added in a mixture of single mounts Mark IIIA and twin powered mounts Mark V.

Postwar modifications of the class were very limited with improved Type 274 lock and follow surface fire control,  Newfoundland had a fragile and unreliable, glasshouse version of Type 275 for twin 4-inch control, Ceylon the short range type 262 MRS1 AA control limited to about  tracking, Bermuda and  Gambia had much more advanced US Mk 63 radar with four High Angle DCT and separate radar disks on the mounts themselves as in US cruiser secondary and tertiary 5- and 3-inch mounts using systems redundant after the cancellation of 's 1955 long refit. Slightly improved new versions of the basic twin 4-inch gun mounts were generally fitted in 1950 extended refits, with electric drive and training and elevation speed of 20 degrees/sec to track subsonic jets. US advice and offers under mutual assistance to replace the obsolete and inaccurate 4-inch guns with twin 3-inch 50-calibre 20-ton turrets of similar weight and dimensions as the old RN twin 4-inch XIX turrets were rejected because the RN had huge stocks of 4-inch and L60 shells These ships would have been altered for water sprays to wash off nuclear fallout and received the Type 960 standard long-range air search radar. Newfoundland received a greater extent of electrical updating, rewiring and more comprehensive AA fire control and was the only Fiji-class vessel updated close to the standard planned for the improved  ships which were intended for hot war with eventual reboilering, while the Fiji class were only refitted for shore bombardment and colonial patrol and presence.

Service
They served with distinction during the Second World War. Jamaica took part in a number of operations, including driving off the heavy cruisers  and Lützow in 1942, the sinking of the battleship  in 1943, and escorting carrier air attacks on the battleship  in 1944.  was lost in 1941, and  the following year. These two ships were decommissioned by 1982.  was also sold, to India, who had it reconstructed in 1954–7 to the same standard as Newfoundland. As , the ship was heavily used from the time of her transfer, seeing action in the 1971 war with Pakistan, and later converted to a harbour training ship in 1979. She was decommissioned by 1984 and then scrapped in 1985, and as such she was the longest-lived (41 years) member of her class.

All ships of the Fiji class were decommissioned from active service with the Royal Navy by 1962 and began being sold for scrap, though Bermuda was fully operational during 1961 and sometimes ventured to sea in 1962 as flagship of the Reserve Fleet. Gambia had been reduced to reserve in December 1960 and Ceylon and Newfoundland sold to Peru a year earlier. Sheffield and Belfast were the last of the wartime commissioned cruisers considered capable of reactivation for GFS and were in semi maintained reserve until the election of the Labour Government in 1964, which immediately decided to scrap them, pending short term use as accommodation ships and consideration for historical preservation.

The last Fiji-class cruisers were seriously deteriorating due to being in an unmaintained extended reserve status many years. Gambia was considered as an alternative for use as the London museum ship, as the ship's condition was more original than Belfast, but Gambia was sold for scrap in 1968, because the state of the ship made it more expensive to preserve than Belfast.

Ships of the class

Original design

 Bermuda – Took part in Operation Torch, the landings in North Africa, during World War II, as well as other operations. After the war, the ship continued in service, seeing much of the world, and receiving a number of refits which helped her last until her decommissioning in 1962. She was scrapped in 1965.
 Fiji – In 1940 Fiji was torpedoed by a German U-boat but survived. In 1941, during the Battle of Crete, Fiji was damaged by a bomb from a German Messerschmitt Bf 109 aircraft, after having survived 20 bomb hits, this one caused her to list; further bomb hits increased the list and the cruiser rolled over an hour later. 523 of her crew were picked up.
 Gambia – Was transferred to the Royal New Zealand Navy from 1943, seeing active service in the British Pacific Fleet. She was returned to the Royal Navy in 1946. The ship was scrapped in 1968.
 Jamaica – Served in World War II, taking part in a number of operations during that war, including the sinking of the battleship Scharnhorst at the Battle of North Cape, driving off German cruiser Admiral Hipper at the Battle of the Barents Sea, and escorting carrier air attacks on the battleship Tirpitz. In the Korean War, Jamaica was known as "The Galloping Ghost of the Korean Coast", due to the North Koreans claiming that she had been sunk three times. In 1955 Jamaica was used to play  in the film The Battle of the River Plate. She was scrapped in 1960.
 Kenya – Was heavily involved in World War II, being deployed to the Far East for some time. Kenya was also involved in the Korean War. She was scrapped in 1962.
 Mauritius – She was involved in the Normandy Landings, and other actions during World War II. She was scrapped in 1965.
  – Was involved in Operation Pedestal (when she was damaged by Italian submarine Axum), the largest attempt to assist the besieged island of Malta in 1942. She participated in raids on Sumatra as part of the Eastern Fleet in 1945, as well as a number of other deployments. She was sold to India in 1958, being renamed . She was scrapped in 1985.
 Trinidad – In 1942 while engaging three German destroyers attacking convoy Convoy PQ13, she was hit by her own torpedo, which had a faulty gyroscope causing it to run in circles, though she did destroy one of the German warships. After temporary repairs in USSR, on return journey through Barents Sea to UK Trinidad was hit by a bomb from Luftwaffe Junkers Ju 88 bombers, further damaging her to an extent that she was scuttled with a torpedo the following day.

Ceylon group
  – Was deployed to the Far East for much of World War II, and was heavily involved in the Korean War. She was decommissioned in 1960, and subsequently sold to Peru, being renamed Coronel Bolognesi. She was decommissioned in 1982.
In 1944, the ship suffered an explosion at Alexandria while docked there. She sustained heavy damage, and suffered a number of casualties. She was in the Far East from 1945, supporting a number of operations there, and was present at the Japanese surrender, being one of the few British ships able to reach Japan in time. She sank the Egyptian frigate Domiat, during the Suez operations, after the latter ship fired on her. She was sold to Peru in 1959, being renamed Almirante Grau and then Capitan Quinones in 1973. She was decommissioned in 1979 and scrapped in Japan, the country that she and her crew fought against in World War II.
  – Escorted  to Washington, D.C. with Winston Churchill embarked. Covered the invasion of Sicily in 1943. She was then hit by a German glide bomb that same year, causing significant damage and killing sixteen of her crew and wounding seven. Following repairs carried out in 1944 in the USA she was recommissioned in the Royal Canadian Navy as HMCS Uganda. She joined the British Pacific Fleet in 1945 taking part in a number of actions in the Far East. She was put in reserve in 1947 but recommissioned as HMCS Quebec for service in the Korean War. The ship was scrapped in 1961.

See also 
 List of ship classes of the Second World War

Notes

References

Bibliography

External links

 Gunnery Layout of "Mauritius" Class Cruiser. from Gunnery Pocket Book 1945 placed online courtesy of Historic Naval Ships Association

 
Cruiser classes
Ship classes of the Royal Navy